Euchromius discopis is a species of moth in the family Crambidae. It is found in Zimbabwe, Botswana, South Africa and Namibia. The habitat consists of steppe, dry woodland areas and macchia vegetations up to an altitude of 2,000 meters.

The length of the forewings is 14–16 mm. The groundcolour of the forewings is creamy white, densely suffused with ochreous to dark brown scales. The hindwings are grey-brown with a darkly bordered termen. Adults are on wing from October to April with peaks in October and February.

References

Moths described in 1919
Crambinae
Moths of Africa